Major-General Neville John Gordon Cameron  (9 October 1873 – 5 December 1955) was a British Army officer who served with distinction in many conflicts, most notably during the First World War.

Military career
Born in Southsea, Hampshire, the third son of General Sir William Gordon Cameron and educated at Wellington College and the Royal Military College, Sandhurst, Cameron was commissioned into the Queen's Own Cameron Highlanders in December 1892.

He saw action in the Sudan in 1898 during the Mahdist War. He became commander of 151st (Durham Light Infantry) Brigade on the Western Front in September 1916 and then became General Officer Commanding the 49th (West Riding) Infantry Division also on the Western Front in October 1917. He commanded the division during all the major battles of the Lys offensive in April 1918 and in the Hundred Days Offensive in autumn 1918 during the First World War.

After handing over his command in June 1919, he became commander of 16th Infantry Brigade in Ireland in January 1921 and commander of 12th Infantry Brigade in November 1923 before returning to command the 49th (West Riding) Division again between 1926 and 1930.

He was colonel of the Queen's Own Cameron Highlanders from 1929 to 1943.

References

Bibliography

|-

|-

1873 births
1955 deaths
British Army major generals
British Army generals of World War I
Companions of the Order of the Bath
Companions of the Order of St Michael and St George
Queen's Own Cameron Highlanders officers
People educated at Wellington College, Berkshire
C
Graduates of the Royal Military College, Sandhurst
British Army personnel of the Second Boer War
People from Southsea